Shih Szu (born October 24, 1953) is an actress from Taoyuan, Taiwan. She was born Lei Qui Si (雷秋思) to parents from Hunan Province. A ballet student from the age of six, at the age of sixteen she joined Shaw Brothers Studio after secondary school and began appearing in films such as The Crimson Charm and The Rescue. However, the film that would rocket her to stardom would be her appearance opposite the famous Cheng Pei-pei in 1971's The Lady Hermit. She then would go on to appear in numerous wuxia and kung fu films such as The Thunderbolt Fist, Heroes of Sung, The Shadow Boxer, The Lady of the Law. The Shaws, seeing great potential in her, gave her a role in Hammer and the Shaws’ co-production The Legend of the 7 Golden Vampires but the film was not successful internationally.

By the mid to late '70s, she was mostly relegated to supporting roles in films for such directors as Chang Cheh (Marco Polo, The Naval Commandos), Chor Yuen (Jade Tiger, Clan of Amazons) and Sun Chung (Avenging Eagle, The Deadly Breaking Sword). She also began to appear in films in Hong Kong and Taiwan outside of Shaw Brothers such as The Revenger and The Heroes. Her last film at the Shaw Brothers studio was in 1980's A Deadly Secret. Shih's last Hong Kong Film was The Murder, a 1983 Crime film directed by 	Lee Chiu. Shih returned to Taiwan and resumed her film career there. Her last appearance was in a Taiwanese television series in 1987.

Filmography

Films 
This is a partial list of films
 1970 Devil's Mirror
 1971 The Lady Hermit 
 1972 The Black Tavern
 1972 The Young Avenger - as adult Bao Zhu  
 1973 The Champion - Ah Chu. 
 1973 The House of 72 Tenants 
 1973 The Villains - Lin Xiao Hong. 
 1974 The Legend of the 7 Golden Vampires 
Shaolin Temple (1976)
The Proud Youth (1978)
Clan of Amazons (1978)
The Deadly Breaking Sword (1979)
The Heroes (1980)
A Deadly Secret (1980)
Gung Foo Wong Dai (1981)

References

External links
 
 HKcinemagic entry

1953 births
Taiwanese Buddhists
Living people
Taiwanese film actresses